Hecla-Grindstone Provincial Park is a provincial park in Manitoba, Canada, which includes Hecla Island, Grindstone (the area located on the mainland peninsula along the west shore of Lake Winnipeg), Black Island and a number of other small islands in Lake Winnipeg, one of the largest freshwater lakes in the world. The park lies adjacent to the northeast side of the Municipality of Bifrost – Riverton in Manitoba.

History
The Government of Manitoba designated Hecla Island a provincial park in 1969. Grindstone Provincial Park was added in 1997 to create Hecla-Grindstone Provincial Park. The park is considered to be a Class V protected area under the IUCN protected area management categories.

The island was settled by the second wave of Icelandic immigrants in 1876. The population thrived for a number of years until faced with the hardships of winters, disease and poor economic outlook for commercial fishing and farming.  The only school on the island closed in 1970.

Landscapes are varied, and include areas of coniferous and mixed forests, limestone cliffs and silica sand beaches, as well as marshes, bogs, fens and wet meadows. Classified as a Natural Park, its purpose is to preserve areas that are representative of the Mid Boreal Lowland portion of the Manitoba Lowlands Natural Region; and accommodate a diversity of recreational opportunities and resource uses.

Currently, Hecla Island boasts a number of tourist attractions from a campground, resort hotel (formerly known as Gull Harbour, renovated and reopened as Radisson Hecla Oasis Resort). In 2013 the resort was purchased by new owners and operates as Lakeview Resorts    The resort features  sandy beaches, summer homes, a full-service marina, Lighthouse trail and world class 18-hole golf course. 

The golf course and marina are operated privately and are independent of the provincial park.

Hecla Village
Hecla Village is a historic village consisting of a fishing museum and functional commercial fishing operation at the Hecla Fish Station adjacent to the dock; the Tommasson Boarding House; the Community Hall; the Hecla School consisting of a replica classroom in one room and a park interpretive centre in the other classroom; the Heritage House Museum, furnished as an Icelandic family house in 1920s to 1940s style, which is operated by the Descendants and Friends of Hecla; the General Store open from May to September; the log house; the Ice House Museum containing carpentry & fishing tools and sawmill artifacts; the Hecla Church featuring non-denominational services and special musical events during July & August; a bed & breakfast in a restored historic Icelandic home owned and operated by commercial fishers; and numerous privately owned cottages.

Grindstone
Grindstone is a long peninsula approximately equal in size to Hecla Island. Grindstone has more than 350 privately owned cottages, a general store and sandy beaches. The residents hold an Annual Grindstone Days in early August with family activities. Wildlife in the park includes the black bear, moose, timber wolf, fox, beaver; birds that can be seen include bald eagle, common loon, American white pelican, ruby-throated hummingbird, and various species of woodpecker, hawk, and owl.

See also
List of protected areas of Manitoba

References

External links

Hecla-Grindstone Provincial Park info at Manitoba Government website
Information on the museums and interpretive centers at the park
ebird hotspots: Hecla Island

Provincial parks of Manitoba
Museums in Manitoba
Industry museums in Canada
History museums in Manitoba
Maritime museums in Canada
Lake Winnipeg
Islands of Lake Winnipeg
Protected areas established in 1969
1969 establishments in Manitoba
Protected areas of Manitoba